Dumah can refer to 

Dumah (angel), an angel mentioned in rabbinical literature
Dumah (Legacy of Kain), a character in the Legacy of Kain video game
Dumah (son of Ishmael), the sixth son of Ishmael, thought to be the forefather of an Arab tribe named for him
Dumat al-Jandal, an ancient city previously known as Dumah or Adummatu, associated with Dumah, the son of Ishmael